The Scottish Labour College was founded in 1916, by John Maclean among others. It was modelled on the Central Labour College in London. It ran  evening classes in Glasgow, Aberdeen, Dundee, Edinburgh and elsewhere.

In 1916  was decided to set up the College to organise more regular events. At the founding meeting 471 delegates representing 271 trade unions were present - but Maclean was in jail. However his speech was delivered by James Dunlop MacDougall, and soon published as a pamphlet: A Plea for a Labour College for Scotland: An Address Prepared By John MacLean and Completed By J D MacDougall During the Author's Imprisonment in 1916.

Attendees included Mary Brooksbank.

See also
 Central Labour College

References

Labor schools